Kameng Hydro Electric Project is a run-of-the river based project situated on Bichom and Tenga Rivers, both tributaries of the Kameng River in West Kameng district of Arunachal Pradesh.  Total installed capacity of project is 600 (4×150) MW. Two units were commissioned in 2020–21 and remain two units are ongoing.

References

Electric power companies of India
Hydroelectric power stations in India
2020 establishments in Arunachal Pradesh
Energy infrastructure completed in 2020
Power stations in Arunachal Pradesh